Hilarius, also known as Hilary the Englishman (fl. 1125), was a Latin poet who is supposed to have been an Englishman.

Life
He was one of the pupils of Pierre Abélard at his oratory of the Paraclete, and addressed to him a copy of verses with its refrain in the vulgar tongue, "Tort avers vos li mestre", Abelard having threatened to discontinue his teaching because of certain reports made by his servant about the conduct of the scholars.

Later Hilarius may have made his way to Angers. His poems are contained in manuscript supp. lat. l008 of the Bibliothèque Nationale, Paris, purchased in 1837 at the sale of M. de Rosny. Quotations from this manuscript had appeared before, but in 1838 it was edited by Champollion Figeac as Hilarii versus et ludi.

After 1125 there is no certain trace of him; he may be the same person as the Hilary who taught classical literature at Orléans, mentioned by William of Tyre and Arnulf of Orléans c. 1150, but it is unknown whether Hilarius of Orléans and Hilarius the playwright are separate people, nor if either of them are the same person as the Hilarius who taught at Angers.

Works
His works consist chiefly of light verses of the goliardic type. There are verses addressed to an English nun named Eva, lines to Rosa, "Ave splendor puellarum, generosa domina", and another poem describes the beauties of the priory of Chaloutre la Petite, in the diocese of Sens, of which the writer was then an inmate. One copy of satirical verses seems to aim at the pope himself. Two other poems, published in an anthology by Rictor Norton, express his love for a 'Boy of Angers' and 'An English boy'.

He also wrote three miracle plays in rhymed Latin with an ad-mixture of French. Two of them, Suscitatio Lazari and Historia de Daniel repraesentanda, are of purely liturgical type. At the end of Lazarus is a stage direction to the effect that if the performance has been given at matins, Lazarus should proceed with the Te Deum, if at vespers, with the Magnificat.

The third, Ludus super iconic Sancti Nicholai, is founded on a sufficiently foolish legend. Petit de Julleville sees in the play a satiric intention and a veiled incredulity that put the piece outside the category of liturgical drama.

A rhymed Latin account of a dispute in which the nuns of Ronceray at Angers were concerned, contained in a cartulary of Ronceray, is also ascribed to the poet, who there calls himself Hilarius Canonicus. The poem is printed in the Bibliothèque de l'Ecole des Chartes (vol. xxxvu. 1876), and was dated by Paul Marchegay from 1121.

Notes

References
 Notice in Hist. litt. de la France (xii. 251-254), supplemented (in xx. 627-630), s.v. Jean Bodel, by Alexis Paulin Paris
 Hilarii versus et ludi, Teichner, Lutetiae Parisiorum 1838.
 Wright, Biographia Britannica literaria, Anglo-Norman Period (1846)
 Petit de Julleville, Les Mystères (vol. i. 1880)
 D. E. Lucombe, The School of Peter Abelard: The Influence of Abelard's Thought in the Early Scholastic Period, Cambridge University Press, 1969.
 Nikolaus M. Häring, "Hilary of Orléans and His Letter Collection."  Studi Medievali, Serie Terza, 14 (1973)
Hilarii Aurelianensis Opera, herausgegeben von Walther Bulst und M.L. Bulst-Thele, Brill, 1989.
Hilarii Versus et Ludi, ed. John Bernard Fuller.  New York: Henry Holt and Company, 1929.
Norton, Rictor (ed.) My Dear Boy:Gay Love Letters through the Centuries.  Leyland Publications, San Francisco, 1998. Previously in: Thomas Stehling, Medieval Latin poems of male love and friendship, Garland, New York and London 1984, p. 70.

12th-century births
12th-century deaths
English male poets